Mondo Enduro was a round-the-world adventure motorcycle expedition in 1995-1996. Team members Austin Vince, Gerald Vince, Chas Penty, Bill Penty, Clive Greenhough, Nick Stubley and Mark Friend set off to go round the world by the longest route possible in the shortest time on Suzuki DR350 Dual Sport bikes.

Their route took them from London, through Central Asia, Kazakhstan and Siberia; then from Alaska to Chile and finally from Cape Town through Africa and the Middle East back to London.

The expedition was filmed and was subsequently made into a 2-part TV series. Shown on Discovery Travel and Adventure Channel over 40 times, this has since reached cult status amongst biking and adventure travel fans.

The real difficulties in the expedition came in the Zilov Gap, the 400 mile roadless section in Siberia. The team got bogged down here and eventually ended up taking the Trans-Siberian railroad to circumvent the last 100 miles of the Zilov Gap.

As well as a cult TV show and DVD, the expedition diaries are a fascinating account of a round-the-world expedition done on a shoestring budget, with rough camping the order of the day.

Episodes

Music
Mondo Enduro uses short musical inserts very often. Most of the music is performed by "The Quakers" band, where Austin Vince is one of the music composers and instrument players.

See also
List of long-distance motorcycle riders
Terra Circa expedition made a new attempt to cross the Zilov Gap in 2001, only few years before it ceased to exist due to Trans-Siberian Highway construction patching the gap.

Books
 Vince, Austin; Bloom, Louis et al. (2006) Mondo Enduro. Ripping Yarns.com. .

Other references
 Mondo Enduro (DVD), Aimimage Productions, (2003). ASIN: B000KNC0ZU.
 Times Educational Supplement Magazine, 23 March 2007, pp8–10.

External links
 MondoEnduro.com — official website.
 Aimimage.com — The official website of Aimimage, the company that produces the Austin Vince travel adventure DVDs.
 Upright Music Vibey 60's selection — Austin Vince's music from the Vibey 60's selection.

Travel books
Motorcycle television series
Long-distance motorcycle riding